Dichagyris elbursica is a moth of the family Noctuidae. It is widespread in almost all mountain systems on higher altitudes of the Near East and Middle East, central Asia and Afghanistan.

Adults are on wing from June to August. There is one generation per year.

External links
 Noctuinae of Israel

elbursica
Moths of Asia
Moths of the Middle East
Moths described in 1937